Ramchandra Chandravanshi is the state legislative assembly member from Bishrampur.  In the 2014 general election, he was elected as MLA of Bishrampur as Bharatiya Janata Party candidate. He is health minister in the Government of Jharkhand. He was MLA of Bishrampur from Rashtriya Janata Dal party from 2005 to 2009.

References 

Living people
Bharatiya Janata Party politicians from Jharkhand
Jharkhand MLAs 2014–2019
Year of birth missing (living people)